Antigua Group, Inc. is an American company based in the Phoenix, Arizona market that specializes in the designing and marketing of men’s and women’s "lifestyle" apparel and sportswear, most notably in the golf industry. In addition to golf, the company also serves the Licensed Sports, Corporate and Specialty Retail markets.

History
The genesis of what would later become Antigua was founded by Tom Dooley, a Phoenix area veteran of the golf industry, in 1976 at a private residence (Dooley’s garage) in Scottsdale, Arizona. A short time later, the first office/warehouse was leased and the company did business under the name Eagle Golf of Scottsdale. It was at this time that the first embroidery machine was purchased and the first sales representative hired to keep up with demand. After a vacation in the late seventies to the British West Indies island of Antigua, Dooley renamed the company in 1979.

In a 1996 interview, Dooley, who prior to launching Antigua was a sales rep for another golf product line, cited his dissatisfaction with his former company’s delivery system as the reason to start his own company.  "If I didn't deliver, I wanted it to be my fault, not someone else's," he said. "It's hard to build a customer base when you can't deliver on time, so it was very important to me to control the ability of the company to deliver or not deliver. It's very important to me to be very honest with a customer if we are unable to deliver ... 99 percent of the customers always will come back if you're honest with them.” 

For the first two decades of Antigua, the company continued to grow and moved in and out of several facilities at this time. In 1982, Antigua moved into a  facility also located in Scottsdale and rebranded as Antigua Sportswear, as to more closely identify with the product. In 1992, the company once again changed its name to The Antigua Group and by 1998, it now occupied . In October 2001, Antigua relocated to a new  facility in Peoria, Arizona where all divisions are housed under one roof.

In 1997 Antigua became a wholly owned subsidiary of Antigua Enterprises, Inc. and in April 2003, the controlling interest of Antigua was sold to Ashley NA, LLC, a subsidiary of  Sports Direct International. of the United Kingdom. It was at this time that Ron McPherson, first employee of the company and recipient of the PGA of America’s Ernie Sabayrac Award for contributions to the golf industry, was named President.

Markets
Antigua began in business serving the golf industry. Antigua has displayed its line at 32 consecutive PGA Merchandise Shows and has been chosen as a vendor partner for Ryder Cup Matches, PGA Championships, Solheim Cups and numerous events on all tours.

In the late 1980s and early 1990s, Antigua entered into the major licensed sports markets, starting with the NCAA. Antigua currently produces official merchandise for the NFL, NBA, NHL and Major League Baseball, Minor League Baseball, colleges and universities, available for sale at department stores, sporting goods outlets, sports specialty stores, team shops and concessionaires. Antigua also serves the corporate casual apparel market, the specialty retail market and most recently entered the tennis market with products for men and women.   Since then, the company is now represented throughout the United States and other parts of the world in the major markets including golf, licensed, corporate and general retail.

Technology
In many Antigua products a technology known as Desert Dry fabric is utilized. Desert Dry is a moisture wicking technology created to absorb and wick moisture.,

Players
Antigua has been outfitting many golfers on the PGA Tour,  Korn Ferry Tour, LPGA and Symetra Tour, as well as the U.S. Ryder Cup team and U.S. Solheim Cup teams. The following is a list of players that either currently or formerly have worn Antigua apparel on tour.

Men
  Notah Begay III  
  Craig Bowden  
  D. J. Brigman  
  Mark Brooks  
  Jim Carter  
  Billy Casper  
  Darren Clarke  
  Bruce Crampton  
  Jim Furyk  
  Troy Kelly  
  Bob May  
  Billy Mayfair 
  Andrew McGee  
  Patrick Moore  
  Bob Murphy  
  Jin Park  
  Scott Sterling  
  Payne Stewart   
  Kevin Streelman  
  Steve Stricker  
  Richard Swift 
  Jerod Turner  
  Grant Waite
  Brian Stuard
  Jason Allred
  Kris Blanks
  Justin Bolli
  Lee Westwood
  Gary Christian

Women
  Stacy Lewis
  Gerina Piller
  Lizette Salas
  Stacy Prammanasudh Upton
  Wendy Ward
  Brittany Lang
  Alison Walshe    
  Giulia Molinaro
  Alena Sharp
  Pat Bradley  
  Dorothy Delasin  
  Liselotte Neumann  
  Annika Sörenstam  
  Allison Hanna Williams
  Brittany Lincicome
  Kris Tamulis
  Austin Ernst
  Kim Kaufman

References 

Sporting goods manufacturers of the United States
Golf equipment manufacturers
Companies based in Phoenix, Arizona